Thorsten Schmugge (born 13 October 1971) is a German former professional footballer who played as a forward.

Career
Schmugge made one appearance for Scottish club Hibernian, in a 2–0 win against Aberdeen on 21 September 1996. Schmugge, who signed for Hibs on the same day as Ray Wilkins, represented the Germany national under-21 football team.

Career statistics

References

External links
 
 Toto Schmugge, www.soccerpractice-schmugge.com
 Thorsten Schmugge, www.ihibs.co.uk
 

1971 births
Living people
Sportspeople from Garmisch-Partenkirchen
German footballers
Footballers from Bavaria
Germany under-21 international footballers
Association football midfielders
Association football forwards
2. Bundesliga players
Regionalliga players
Scottish Football League players
VfL Bochum players
VfL Bochum II players
Wuppertaler SV players
1. FC Saarbrücken players
Hibernian F.C. players
SG Wattenscheid 09 players
KFC Uerdingen 05 players
SV Wilhelmshaven players
Kickers Emden players
Dallas Sidekicks (PASL/MASL) players
German expatriate footballers
German expatriate sportspeople in Scotland
Expatriate footballers in Scotland